The 2019 FIVB Volleyball Men's Challenger Cup qualification was a series of tournaments to decide teams which played in the 2019 FIVB Volleyball Men's Challenger Cup. The 2019 Challenger Cup featured 6 teams. Only one place was allocated to the hosts. The remaining 5 places were determined by a qualification process, in which entrants from among the other teams from the five FIVB confederations competed.

Qualification summary
A total of 6 teams qualified for the tournament.

1.Originally, the representatives from AVC and CSV would play a playoff for a spot. But, South Korea, chosen by FIVB, refused to represent the AVC. So the AVC–CSV playoff was canceled and the representatives from CSV booked a direct qualification.

Means of qualification

Continental qualification tournaments

AVC (Asia and Oceania)
FIVB selected South Korea to represent the AVC for the 2019 Challenger Cup via the FIVB World Ranking as of 1 October 2018 because less than 4 teams have registered to participate in the qualifier. But, South Korea refused to participate. So the AVC–CSV playoff was canceled and the representatives from CSV directly qualified for the 2019 Challenger Cup.

CAVB (Africa)
FIVB selected a team to represent the CAVB for the 2019 Challenger Cup via the FIVB World Ranking as of 1 October 2018 because CAVB did not host the qualifier.

CEV (Europe)

Final venue:  Saku Suurhall, Tallinn, Estonia
Dates: 25 May – 22 June 2019
The top two teams qualified for the 2019 Challenger Cup.

CSV (South America)

Venue:  Auditorio Multifuncional de Colima, Colima City, Mexico
Dates: 16–21 June 2019
The best South American team not yet participating in the 2019 Nations League qualified for the 2019 Challenger Cup.

NORCECA (North America)

Venue:  Coliseo de la Ciudad Deportiva, Havana, Cuba
Dates: 30 May – 1 June 2019
The winners qualified for the 2019 Challenger Cup.

References

External links
Qualification Process
2019 Challenger Cup North American Qualifier – official website

 
FIVB Volleyball Men's Challenger Cup qualification